Ellek is a belde (town) in Düziçi district of Osmaniye Province, Turkey. Ellek, a former village, was declared a seat of township after being merged with another village in 1968. Main economic activity is peanut agriculture and dairying.

References

Populated places in Osmaniye Province
Towns in Turkey
Düziçi District